Castle Rock (sometimes referred to as the Rock) is a fictional town appearing in Stephen King's fictional Maine topography, providing the setting for a number of his novels, novellas, and short stories.  Castle Rock first appeared in King's 1979 novel The Dead Zone and has since been referred to or used as the primary setting in many other works by King.

As a native of Durham, Maine, King was inspired by his hometown when creating Castle Rock. The town name is taken from the fictional mountain fort in William Golding's 1954 novel Lord of the Flies.

Other notable fictional towns that King has used as the central setting in more than one work include Derry and Jerusalem's Lot.

Population and geographical location 
The population of Castle Rock was 1,280 by 1959 and around 1,500 in Needful Things. According to the book cover, Needful Things was "The Last Castle Rock Story". However, the town later served as the setting for the short story "It Grows on You", published in King's 1993 collection Nightmares & Dreamscapes. This story, according to King, serves as an epilogue to Needful Things.

In Needful Things, Castle Rock is placed 18 miles southwest of South Paris. In the Body, Harlow is 30 miles east of Castle Rock. In the anthology film Creepshow (1982), written by King,  a sign at the end of "The Lonesome Death of Jordy Verrill"  puts Portland at 37 miles, and Boston at 188 miles. "Weeds", the 1976 short story on which "The Lonesome Death of Jordy Verrill" was based, was set in New Hampshire.

Geographically, this puts Castle Rock within 37 miles of Portland, Maine. This region could include real places such as Durham, Lisbon, Danville, Auburn, Lewiston, Bridgton, and maybe even Sabattus. A map on King's official website places Castle Rock in Oxford County, in the vicinity of Woodstock. The works in which Castle Rock appears place the town in the fictional "Castle County", which also includes such fictional towns as Castle Lake and Castle View. The location of Castle Rock may also be related to Marblehead, which has a park by the same name, but most likely not.

Part of the Castle Rock area is underlain by limestone. It makes the water hard and hosts at least one bat-infested cave unknown to the inhabitants, as noted in Cujo.

Besides Castle Rock and the oft-used Derry and Jerusalem's Lot, King has created other fictional Maine towns. These include Chamberlain in Carrie; Chester's Mill in Under the Dome; Haven in The Tommyknockers; Little Tall Island in Dolores Claiborne and Storm of the Century; Harlow in Revival; Tarkers Mills in Cycle of the Werewolf, and Ludlow (unrelated to the real Maine town of Ludlow) in Pet Sematary and The Dark Half.

Characters of Castle Rock

George Bannerman
George Bannerman is the sheriff of Castle Rock, appearing in The Dead Zone, Cujo, and "The Body". In The Dead Zone, Bannerman, after years of failing to catch the local serial killer the Castle Rock Strangler, approaches Johnny Smith to help catch the Strangler. Bannerman is horrified to learn the Strangler is, in reality, Deputy Frank Dodd, whom he viewed as a surrogate son. The two men corner Dodd in his house, where he commits suicide. In Cujo, Bannerman helps organize the search for Donna and Tad Trenton, who are currently missing, and unbeknownst to anyone, trapped at the Camber house by the titular rabid Saint Bernard. Suspicious when there are no leads to their location and inspired by his previous investigation with Smith and the Frank Dodd case, Bannerman checks at the Camber house and discovers Donna and Tad. Before he can phone in this discovery, Cujo appears and viciously mauls and disembowels him.

Bannerman was portrayed by Tom Skerritt in The Dead Zone and Sandy Ward in Cujo. In the television adaptation of The Dead Zone, Bannerman is merged with the character of Walt Hazlett to form the character Sheriff Walt Bannerman, portrayed by Chris Bruno.

Joe Camber
Appeared in the novel Cujo (1981) and portrayed by Ed Lauter in the film adaptation of the same name (1983), Joe is an alcoholic, controlling man who frequently abuses his wife Charity and is generally hostile to everyone around him; the only two exceptions are his son Brett and his friend Gary Pervier. The townspeople are aware of his hard drinking but consider him a competent, honest mechanic. Joe is mauled to death by his own dog, Cujo, once he becomes rabid.

Alan Pangborn
Alan Pangborn appears in the novel The Dark Half (1989), the novella "The Sun Dog" (1990), and the novel Needful Things (1991). He is also a primary character in the Castle Rock television series based on King's novels.  In The Dark Half, Pangborn is introduced as the Sheriff of the town Castle Rock. He has a wife Annie and two children, Toby ("Al") and Todd. The story establishes that Pangborn has a penchant for magic tricks. Pangborn re-appears again as the main protagonist of Needful Things, which establishes him as a widower dating Polly Chalmers. The story reveals that Annie and Todd died in a car crash soon after the events of The Dark Half. Pangborn was portrayed by Michael Rooker in the film adaptation of The Dark Half and Ed Harris in the film Needful Things. Alan and Polly are also briefly mentioned in Bag of Bones (1998) in a conversation between author Michael Noonan and the then-Castle County Sheriff Norris Ridgewick. Ridgewick mentions they are "doing real well" after having relocated to New Hampshire, though Polly still suffers from arthritis.
 
In the television series Castle Rock, which features an original story set around established Stephen King characters and stories, Alan Pangborn worked as town sheriff in the 1980s and '90s, but is now retired. He is in a romantic relationship with town resident Ruth Deaver and has pursued her since at least 1990. He is said to be a widower and shown to have an interest in magic and sleight of hand, but no mention is made in regards to Polly ever being in his life. Since the show and its characters regularly discuss the town's history with murder and strange events, but do not ever reference the destruction the town suffered in Needful Things,  the main events of that novel perhaps did not happen in the continuity of the show, and this version of Pangborn never met Polly. The younger Pangborn of the 1980 and 90s is portrayed by actor Jeffrey Pierce while the Pangborn of 2018 is portrayed by Scott Glenn.

Ace Merrill
John "Ace" Merrill is a psychopathic, cruel bully who appears in "The Body", "The Sun Dog", and Needful Things. In "The Body", Ace is the leader of some bullies who torment Gordie Lachance, Chris Chambers, Teddy Duchamp, and Vern Tessio. He later attempts to murder them after they find the body of Ray Browers, so that Ace and his gang will get the credit. Chris scares Ace and his gang off by threatening them with a handgun. As an adult, Gordie sees that Ace has become an alcoholic, overweight millworker and takes pleasure in seeing his tormentor so miserable. By the time of "The Sun Dog", Ace has been sent to Shawshank State Penitentiary and disowned by his only remaining family, his uncle Pop Merrill. In Needful Things, Ace returns to his hometown, on the run to avoid being murdered by two drug dealers over unpaid debts. Ace now holds a grudge against Sheriff Alan Pangborn for being the one to arrest him. Ace becomes the right-hand man of Leland Gaunt, a demon who provides Ace with cocaine and the implications of buried treasure in exchange for procuring guns for him. In the climax of the novel, Ace and Buster Keeton team up at Gaunt's behest to wreak havoc. Merrill holds Pangborn's girlfriend Polly Chalmers at gunpoint when Gaunt and Pangborn confront each other, only to be shot in the head by Norris.

Merrill is played by Kiefer Sutherland in Stand by Me and Paul Sparks in the television series Castle Rock.

Pop Merrill
Reginald Marion "Pop" Merrill is a loan shark and the owner of the Emporium Galorium, a local junk store, who appears in "The Sun Dog" and is mentioned in Needful Things. Pop is a greedy, cruel, and miserly man, who often scams his customers and is disliked by the rest of the town. In spite of this, Pop is extremely wealthy and well-connected and serves a variety of clients, from desperate people he takes advantage of to renowned billionaires. In "The Sun Dog", Kevin Delevan takes his haunted Sun 660 Polaroid camera (which only produces photos of a malevolent dog standing in front of a white picket fence that becomes increasingly monstrous as more photos are taken with it) to Pop, who is unable to uncover anything wrong with the camera. Kevin and his father John (who had previously been the victim of Pop's outrageous interest rates) resolve to destroy the camera, but Pop, sensing the opportunity for money, swaps the camera with another Sun 660 and keeps the haunted one. All of Pop's clients balk at it, either believing it to be a fraud or being overcome with dread when they see it. The dog also begins to gradually drive him mad, allowing it to take control of him and force him to take photos on the Sun 660, which Pop believes to be a broken cuckoo clock he is repairing. Kevin and John, who had caught on to Pop's scam, attempt to stop him from releasing the dog, but they are too late; the dog breaks free, causing molten plastic to slice Pop's throat open. The dog is trapped once again by Kevin, and the Emporium burns down. Needful Things shows that the reason for Pop's death is unknown to the general public, though everyone, even his nephew Ace Merrill, is happy that he is dead. Gaunt later convinces Ace that Pop had buried part of his fortune to gain his assistance and cause a feud between him and Sheriff Pangborn.

Pop was portrayed by Tim Robbins in the television series Castle Rock.

Gary Pervier
Gary Pervier is the closest neighbor to Joe Camber, and a local WWII veteran and alcoholic, who appears in Cujo. During WWII, Gary charged a German machine gun nest before retreating his squadron to safety. Gary wins a DSC award afterwards for this event. In the summer of 1980, Gary is living just outside of Castle Rock in a dilapidated house and is an alcoholic. Gary's best friend is his neighbor, Joe Camber. After Joe's wife Charity wins a large sum of lottery money, Joe convinces Gary to go on a trip with him down to Boston while Charity and Joe's son Brett are visiting Charity's sister in Connecticut. On the morning they are supposed to leave for Boston,  Joe's rabid  Saint Bernard Cujo attacks Gary while he is having a hangover in his yard. Cujo bites Gary on the shoulder before kicking Cujo away. Gary runs into his house to get his shotgun, but Cujo breaks through the screen door and charges at Gary, riping his throat out. 

Gary was portrayed by Mills Watson in Cujo (film).

Kevin Delevan
Kevin Delevan is a local teenager who appears in "The Sun Dog". On his 15th birthday, Kevin receives a Sun 660 Polaroid camera as a gift. The camera quickly proves to be supernatural in nature, as it only produces photographs of a malevolent dog in front of a white picket fence, that becomes closer to the photograph and increasingly monstrous as more photos are taken with the camera. For lack of a better option, Kevin takes the camera to Pop Merrill, and both quickly conclude that the camera is haunted. Kevin's father John learns about this, as well, and the two decide to destroy the camera; however, Pop swaps the camera with another Sun 660. Kevin experiences psychic dreams where he enters “Polaroidville”, an odd dimension that exists within photographs; Kevin comes to the conclusion that the dog is a predator from Polaroidsville that sees the real world as a new hunting ground, and that he is receiving the messages from Polaroidsville's "dogcatcher", who, through cryptic clues, reveals to Kevin that the only way to stop the dog is to take another photo of it and that Pop kept the camera. John and Kevin go to stop Pop from freeing the dog, but are too late; the dog breaks loose and kills Merrill, but Kevin is able to trap it within another Sun 660. A year later, on his 16th birthday, Kevin is given a computer as a gift. When he turns it on, he receives a message from the dog, which reveals that the dog is loose again and is eager to get revenge against Kevin.

Frank Dodd
Frank Dodd is a deputy serving under Sheriff George Bannerman, while also moonlighting as the Castle Rock Strangler, a serial killer who rapes and murders women, who appears in The Dead Zone novel, and is referenced in almost all stories set in Castle Rock. Dodd uses his involvement in the investigation to keep track of its progress and avoid capture.  Dodd murders 6 women and girls from 1970 to 1975. Dodd's first victim is a young waitress whom he rapes and strangles in the Castle Rock town common. After Dodd murders a nine-year-old girl, who is found in the same location as his first victim, Bannerman brings in  psychic Johnny Smith to assist in the investigation. Smith discovers Dodd is the killer, and Bannerman and Smith corner Dodd in his home, where he commits suicide and writes “I CONFESS” in lipstick on his neck. By the time of Cujo, Frank has become a local boogeyman to the children of Castle Rock. Tad Trenton's closet is haunted by a malevolent spirit that claims to be Dodd's ghost and threatens to murder the boy. The ghost later appears before the boy's father Vic while he sits in Tad's room.

Dodd is portrayed by Nicholas Campbell in The Dead Zone film and by Michael Rogers in the television series.

Cujo
Cujo is a Saint Bernard owned by the Camber family and the titular character of Cujo, and is referenced in several of King's other works. Cujo is initially a playful dog that is friendly to every person he meets, although rabbits drive him wild. One day he chases a rabbit into a cave and is bitten by a rabid bat. No one notes much significance to the wound, but as it festers Cujo becomes depressed and occasionally ill-tempered (people think he's just bothered by the summer heat or, as observed by two delivery men, "going bad"), then goes mad. He becomes convinced that humans are responsible for his pain, and this prompts him to go on a murderous rampage. After murdering Joe Camber and Gary Pervier, Cujo traps Donna and Tad Trenton inside their broken-down car after they come for auto repairs. Cujo refuses to allow them to leave, and continually tries to break in and kill them. When Donna leaves the car to escape, Cujo bites her repeatedly, though she manages to evade death, and Cujo continues to keep a watchful eye over the car. Eventually, Sheriff George Bannerman arrives and attempts to phone in his discovery of the two, only for Cujo to disembowel him. Donna impales him in the eye with a broken baseball bat and later grabs Bannerman's revolver and shoots Cujo. In Needful Things, Polly Chalmers, while at the now-abandoned Camber home, encounters Cujo's malevolent and restless spirit, which chases her out of the farm.

Norris Ridgewick
Norris Ridgewick is a deputy sheriff of Castle County, who served under Alan Pangborn and later succeeded him as sheriff. Ridgewick serves a minor role in The Dark Half as comic relief. He reappears as a main character in Needful Things, being one of those manipulated by Leland Gaunt into helping him drive the town into chaos. After realizing his part in it, Ridgewick initially attempts suicide, but instead decides to help restore order and plays a crucial part in stopping Gaunt. Ridgewick was portrayed by Zachary Mott in The Dark Half, Ray McKinnon in Needful Things, and Timothy John Smith in the television series Castle Rock. He also makes a brief appearance in Bag of Bones and is a secondary character in both Gwendy's Magic Feather and Gwendy's Final Task.

Polly Chalmers
Polly Chalmers is a local eccentric and Alan Pangborn's girlfriend, who appears in The Dark Half and Needful Things.  She is portrayed by Bonnie Bedelia in the 1993 film adaptation of the same name.

Buster Keeton
Danforth "Buster" Keeton is the cruel, hot-tempered, and mentally unstable town selectman, who appears in The Dark Half and Needful Things. Keeton plays a prominent role in Needful Things, where Gaunt's manipulations and exploitation of his instability and gambling debts to drive him into madness and convince Keeton to become his assistant. He is played by JT Walsh in Needful Things.

Leland Gaunt
Leland Gaunt is a demon who serves as the primary antagonist of Needful Things. He arrives and serves as the proprietor of the titular shop, making people pull pranks on others in exchange for worthless items; these pranks inevitably lead to  someone's death, and he is eventually revealed to have been wandering the earth for centuries, collecting the souls of his unwitting customers. He recruits Buster Keeton and Ace Merrill, who aid in his efforts. At the end of the novel, Pangborn frees the souls Gaunt collected and forces him out of Castle Rock. The epilogue reveals he has set up a new shop in Junction City, Iowa, to begin the cycle anew.

Thad Beaumont
Thad Beaumont is an author and the main protagonist of The Dark Half. Thad specializes primarily in writing cerebral fiction, but writes gritty and hyperviolent crime novels under the pseudonym George Stark to support his family. Thad retires the pseudonym after being discovered and subsequently blackmailed by Fred Clawson, jokingly declaring Stark dead. Stark returns, now inhabited by the spirit of Thad's twin whom he absorbed in utero, and goes on a killing spree of everyone involved in his "death". Though Stark is eventually killed, Thad's wife leaves him and takes the kids. Thad makes a brief appearance in Needful Things, having descended into alcoholism and occasionally calling Pangborn. He is mentioned to have committed suicide in Bag of Bones.

Andy Clutterbuck
Andy Clutterbuck is a deputy sheriff of Castle County who served under Alan Pangborn. In both The Dark Half and Needful Things, he plays a minor role, assisting in Pangborn's investigations. His wife is killed in the climax of Needful Things, and Clutterbuck is left grief-stricken; he succumbs to alcoholism and eventually commits suicide.
Following Needful Things, Clutterbuck has appeared again in Lisey's Story and as police chief in Drunken Fireworks in 2015.

Literary works set in Castle Rock

Works that refer to Castle Rock

In other media

Television 

In February 2017, Hulu announced they were partnering with J. J. Abrams and Stephen King to create a limited series entitled Castle Rock. Later that month, Hulu issued a ten-episode order for the series, with production set to begin at a later date. It was also revealed that the series would bring together characters and situations from throughout King's entire canon. Filming for the series began in August 2017. The small Western Massachusetts town of Orange served as a stand in for filming scenes set in Castle Rock.

The series premiered on Hulu on July 25, 2018. In August 2018, Hulu announced that they have renewed the series for a second season, which premiered on October 23, 2019.

Film 
The town of Castle Rock made its first onscreen appearance in the 1983 film Cujo. In that film, Mendocino and Santa Rosa, California stood in for Castle Rock. That same year, Castle Rock appeared onscreen again in The Dead Zone. This time, the Maine town was portrayed by locations in and around Niagara Falls, Ontario, including the Screaming Tunnel and Queen's Royal Park in neighboring Niagara-on-the-Lake.

Stand by Me (1986), a film adaptation of King's 1982 novella The Body, was the next film in which Castle Rock appeared. However, in this version of the story, Castle Rock is located in the state of Oregon. Filming took place in Oregon as well as California, with locations including Brownsville, Oregon and Lake Britton in Shasta County, California. Director Rob Reiner later named his production company Castle Rock Entertainment, which subsequently produced several adaptations of King's works.

In addition to appearing onscreen, the town of Castle Rock is also referenced in several films. The first such reference came in the 1982 film Creepshow, which was Stephen King's first produced screenplay. At the end of the film's "The Lonesome Death of Jordy Verrill" segment, a directional sign shows Castle Rock located five miles away.

In the 1990 film adaptation of Graveyard Shift,  the character Jane Wisconsky tells John Hall she is originally from Castle Rock.

The screenplay to the 1992 film Sleepwalkers was also written by King. In the film, the sheriff calls for backup from Castle Rock. However, this version of Castle Rock is located in Indiana.

The town of Gibsons, British Columbia, Canada serves as the location of Castle Rock in the 1993 film Needful Things.

In the 2007 film adaptation of King's novella The Mist (1980), David Drayton reads a newspaper called The Castle Rock Times.

References

External links 
Map of Maine from Stephen King's official website

Fictional populated places in Maine
Fictional populated places created by Stephen King
Fictional elements introduced in 1979
Castle Rock (franchise)